Seyyed Davud may refer to:
 Seyyed Davud, Khuzestan